David Harding, Counterspy is a 1950 American film noir crime film directed by Ray Nazarro and starring Willard Parker. It was based on the radio series Counterspy.

Plot
An American spy is killed under suspicious circumstances. His friend Jerry Baldwin, a naval commander, is assigned to replace him and stop a saboteur in a torpedo factory.

Cast
 Willard Parker as Lt. Comdr. Jerry A. Baldwin
 Audrey Long as Betty Iverson
 Raymond Greenleaf as Dr. George Vickers 
 Harlan Warde as Hopkins
 Alex Gerry as Charles Kingston
 Howard St. John as David Harding

References

External links

1950 films
Films based on radio series
American crime films
1950 crime films
American black-and-white films
1950s English-language films
Films directed by Ray Nazarro
1950s American films
Columbia Pictures films